Gürcan Gözüm (born 30 August 1994) is a Turkish footballer who plays for 68 Aksaray Belediyespor. He made his Süper Lig debut on 17 May 2013. He is predominantly recognized as a central midfielder, but also plays defensive and attacking midfield.

References

External links
 
 
 
 Gürcan Gözüm at msn.com
 Gürcan Gözüm at spox.com
 

1994 births
Living people
People from Aksaray
Turkish footballers
Alanyaspor footballers
Aydınspor footballers
Gaziantep F.K. footballers
Eyüpspor footballers
Kahramanmaraşspor footballers
Süper Lig players
TFF Second League players
Association football midfielders